Rosh HaShanah (literally "head of the year") is the Jewish New Year. The biblical name for this holiday is Yom Teruah (lit. "day of shouting/blasting") It is the first of the Jewish High Holy Days ("Days of Awe"), as specified by Leviticus 23:23–25, that occur in the late summer/early autumn of the Northern Hemisphere. Rosh Hashanah begins a ten-day period of penitence culminating in Yom Kippur, as well as beginning the cycle of autumnal religious festivals running through Sukkot and ending in Shemini Atzeret.

Rosh Hashanah is a two-day observance and celebration that begins on the first day of Tishrei, which is the seventh month of the ecclesiastical year. In contrast to the ecclesiastical lunar new year on the first day of the first month Nisan, the spring Passover month which marks Israel's exodus from Egypt, Rosh Hashanah marks the beginning of the civil year, according to the teachings of Judaism, and is the traditional anniversary of the creation of Adam and Eve, the first man and woman according to the Hebrew Bible, as well as the initiation of humanity's role in God's world.

Rosh Hashanah customs include sounding the shofar (a hollowed-out ram's horn), as prescribed in the Torah, following the prescription of the Hebrew Bible to "raise a noise" on Yom Teruah. Its rabbinical customs include attending synagogue services and reciting special liturgy about teshuva, as well as enjoying festive meals. Eating symbolic foods is now a tradition, such as apples dipped in honey, hoping to evoke a sweet new year.

Etymology
 is the Hebrew word for "head",  is the definite article ("the"), and  means year. Thus  means "head of the year", referring to the Jewish day of new year.

The term  in its current meaning does not appear in the Torah.

The term  appears once in the Bible (Ezekiel 40:1), where it has a different meaning: either generally the time of the "beginning of the year", or possibly a reference to Yom Kippur, or to the month of Nisan.

In the Jewish prayer-books (the Siddur and Machzor), Rosh Hashanah is also called Yom Hazikaron (the day of remembrance), not to be confused with the modern Israeli remembrance day of the same name.

Origin
The origin of the Hebrew New Year is connected to the beginning of the economic year in the agricultural societies of the ancient Near East. The New Year was the beginning of the cycle of sowing, growth, and harvest; the harvest was marked by its own set of major agricultural festivals. The Semites generally set the beginning of the new year in autumn, while other ancient civilizations chose spring for that purpose, such as the Persians or Greeks; the primary reason was agricultural in both cases, the time of sowing the seed and bringing in the harvest.

Some scholars posit a connection between the Babylonian festival Akitu and Rosh Hashanah, as there are some striking similarities. The Akitu festival of Ur was celebrated in the beginning of Nisanu (first month), which lasted at least five days, and again in Tashritu, the seventh month, which lasted eleven days. In one of the rituals and cultic processions the god Marduk (and the earthly Babylonian representative) was re-enthroned, and the king in a penitential ritual had to bow down before Marduk and convince him that he has not shirked off his duties as king and that he has not sinned. Marduk also made judgements that day and decided the fate of his subjects (the Babylonians) for the upcoming year. On the last day the gods reconvened to finalize what has been decided in the previous assembly. This particularly is reminiscent of the ten day gap between Rosh Hashanah and Yom Kippur, in the latter which God is said to sign the fate of the wicked and the good in the book of life and dead that has already been decided on Rosh Hashanah. Akitu was also strongly tied to the creation myth of Enuma Elish and the victory of Marduk over the sea monster Tiamat, and the creation of the universe from her corpse. Similarly it is said that the world was created on Rosh Hashanah.

The reckoning of Tishrei as the beginning of the Jewish year began with the early Egyptians and was preserved by the Hebrew nation, being also alluded to in the Hebrew Bible (Genesis 7:11) when describing the Great Deluge at the time of Noah. This began during the "second month" (Marheshvan) counting from Tishrei, a view that has largely been accepted by the Sages of Israel.

The Four "New Years"
Rosh Hashanah marks the start of the numbering of a new year in the Hebrew calendar, but, just as modern governments may insist on taxing over a fiscal year, universities observe an academic year, and the Christian liturgical calendar begins on the first Sunday in Advent, in Jewish law, four different ″New Years″ are observed. In order of import, they are Rosh Hashanah (the first of Tishrei), the first of Nisan, the first of Elul, and Tu BiShvat (the fifteenth of Shevat). Each one delineates the beginning of a "year" for different legal or ecclesiastical purposes.  The Talmudic distinctions among the "New Years" are discussed in the tractate on Rosh Hashanah.  Rosh Hashanah is the new year for calculating ordinary calendar years, Sabbatical years, Jubilee years, and dates inscribed on legal deeds and contracts. Rosh Hashanah commemorates the creation of Man.  In Jewish practice, the months are numbered starting with the spring month of Nisan, making Tishrei the seventh month; Rosh Hashanah, the first day of the new calendar year, is also actually the first day of the seventh month.

The second of these "New Years", the first of the lunar month Nisan (usually corresponds to the months March–April in the Gregorian calendar) is the beginning of the ecclesiastical year; the months are numbered beginning with Nisan.  It marks the start of the year for the three Jewish pilgrimages. Its injunction is expressly stated in the Hebrew Bible: "This month shall be unto you  of months" (Exodus 12:2).  Their injunction is expressly stated in the Hebrew Bible: "Three times in the year you shall keep a feast unto me... the feast of unleavened bread (Passover)... the feast of harvest (Shavuot)... and the feast of ingathering (Sukkot) which is " (Exodus 23:14–16). "At the departing of the year" implies that the new year begins here. It is also when a new year is added to the reign of Jewish kings.

The third "New Year," the first of Elul, the new year for animals, began the religious taxation period for tithing animals in Biblical times.  Sensibly, Elul corresponds to the Gregorian August/September, after the spring birthings, when it was relatively simple to count the number of animals in herds.  The fourth "New Year," Tu Bishvat, the new year for trees, began the religious taxation period for tithing fruits and nuts from trees. Again, sensibly, Shevat corresponds to the Gregorian January/February, the end of the Mediterranean wet season when the majority of the year's rainfall had occurred. Taking fruit or nuts from a tree younger than three years old, with the birthday counted as Tu Bishvat, was prohibited.

Religious significance

The Mishnah contains the second known reference to Rosh Hashanah as the "day of judgment" (Yom haDin). In the Talmud tractate on Rosh Hashanah, it states that three books of account are opened on Rosh Hashanah, wherein the fate of the wicked, the righteous, and those of the intermediate class are recorded. The names of the righteous are immediately inscribed in the Book of Life and they are sealed "to live". The intermediate class is allowed a respite of ten days, until Yom Kippur, to reflect, repent, and become righteous; the wicked are "blotted out of the book of the living forever."

Some midrashic descriptions depict God as sitting upon a throne, while books containing the deeds of all humanity are opened for review, and each person passes in front of him for evaluation of his or her deeds.

"The Holy One said, 'on Rosh Hashanah recite before Me [verses of] Sovereignty, Remembrance, and Shofar blasts: Sovereignty so that you should make Me your King; Remembrance so that your remembrance should rise up before Me. And through what? Through the Shofar.' (Rosh Hashanah 16a, 34b)"

This is reflected in the prayers composed by classical rabbinic sages for Rosh Hashanah found in traditional machzorim where the theme of the prayers is the "coronation" of God as King of the universe, in preparation for the acceptance of judgments that will follow on that day.

Shofar blowing

The best-known ritual of Rosh Hashanah is the blowing of the shofar, a musical instrument made from an animal horn. The shofar is blown at various points during the Rosh Hashanah prayers, and it is customary in most communities to have a total of 100 blasts on each day.

While the blowing of the shofar is a Biblical statute, it is also a symbolic "wake-up call", stirring Jews to mend their ways and repent. The shofar blasts call out: "Sleepers, wake up from your slumber! Examine your ways and repent and remember your Creator."

Prayer service
On Rosh Hashanah day, religious poems called , are added to the regular services. A special prayer book, the machzor (plural ), is used on Rosh Hashanah and Yom Kippur. A number of additions are made to the regular service, most notably an extended repetition of the Amidah prayer for both Shacharit and Mussaf. The shofar is blown during Mussaf at several intervals. (In many synagogues, even little children come and hear the shofar being blown.) The Alenu prayer is recited during the silent prayer as well as the repetition of the Mussaf Amidah.

The narrative in the Book of Genesis describing the announcement of Isaac's birth and his subsequent birth is part of the Torah readings in synagogues on the first day of Rosh Hashanah, and the narrative of the sacrifice and binding of Isaac is read in synagogue on the second day of Rosh Hashanah.

The Mussaf Amidah prayer on Rosh Hashanah is unique in that apart from the first and last three blessings, it contains three central blessings making a total of nine. These blessings are entitled "Malchuyot" (Kingship, and also includes the blessing for the holiness of the day as is in a normal Mussaf), "Zichronot" (Remembrance), and "Shofarot" (concerning the shofar). Each section contains an introductory paragraph followed by selections of verses about the "topic". The verses are three from the Torah, three from the Ketuvim, three from the Nevi'im, and one more from the Torah. During the repetition of the Amidah, the shofar is sounded (except on Shabbat) after the blessing that ends each section. Recitation of these three blessings is first recorded in the Mishna, though writings by Philo and possibly even Psalms 81 suggest that the blessings may have been recited on Rosh Hashanah even centuries earlier.

Customs

Days before Rosh Hashanah
Rosh Hashanah is preceded by the month of Elul, during which Jews are supposed to begin a self-examination and repentance, a process that culminates in the ten days of the Yamim Nora'im, the Days of Awe, beginning with Rosh Hashanah and ending with the holiday of Yom Kippur.

The shofar is traditionally blown on weekday mornings, and in some communities also in the afternoon, for the entire month of Elul, the month preceding Rosh Hashanah. The sound of the shofar is intended to awaken the listeners from their "slumbers" and alert them to the coming judgment.
The shofar is not blown on Shabbat.

In the period leading up to Rosh Hashanah, penitential prayers called selichot, are recited. The Sephardic tradition is to start at the beginning of Elul, while the Ashkenazic and Italian practice is to start a few days before Rosh Hashanah.

The day before Rosh Hashanah day is known as Erev Rosh Hashanah ("Rosh Hashanah eve"). It is the 29th day of the Hebrew month of Elul, ending at sundown, when Rosh Hashanah commences. Some communities perform Hatarat nedarim (a nullification of vows) after the morning prayer services. Many Orthodox men immerse in a mikveh in honor of the coming day.

Symbolic foods

Rosh Hashanah meals usually include apples dipped in honey to symbolize a sweet new year; this is a late medieval Ashkenazi addition, though it is now almost universally accepted. Other foods with a symbolic meaning may be served, depending on local minhag ("custom"), such as the head of a fish (to symbolize the prayer "let us be the head and not the tail").

Many communities hold a "Rosh Hashanah seder" during which blessings are recited over a variety of symbolic dishes. The blessings have the incipit "Yehi ratzon", meaning "May it be Thy will." In many cases, the name of the food in Hebrew or Aramaic represents a play on words (a pun). The Yehi Ratzon platter may include apples (dipped in honey, baked or cooked as a compote called mansanada); dates; pomegranates; black-eyed peas; pumpkin-filled pastries called rodanchas; leek fritters called keftedes de prasa; beets; and a whole fish with the head intact. It is also common among Sephardim to eat stuffed vegetables called legumbres yaprakes.

Some of the symbolic foods eaten are dates, black-eyed peas, leeks, spinach, and gourd, all of which are mentioned in the Talmud: "Let a man be accustomed to eat on New Year's Day gourds (קרא), and fenugreek (רוביא), leeks (כרתי), beet [leaves] (סילקא), and dates (תמרי)."

Pomegranates are used in many traditions, to symbolize being fruitful like the pomegranate with its many seeds. Typically, round challah bread is served, to symbolize the cycle of the year. From ancient to quite modern age, lamb head or fish head were served. Nowadays, gefilte fish and lekach are commonly served by Ashkenazic Jews on this holiday. On the second night, new fruits are served to warrant the inclusion of the shehecheyanu blessing.

Tashlikh

The ritual of tashlikh is performed on the afternoon of the first day of Rosh Hashanah by most Ashkenazic and Sephardic Jews (but not by Spanish and Portuguese Jews or some Yemenites, as well as those who follow the practices of the Vilna Gaon). Prayers are recited near natural flowing water, and one's sins are symbolically cast into the water. Many also have the custom to throw bread or pebbles into the water, to symbolize the "casting off" of sins. In some communities, if the first day of Rosh Hashanah occurs on Shabbat, tashlikh is postponed until the second day. The traditional service for tashlikh is recited individually and includes the prayer "Who is like unto you, O God... Though once considered a solemn individual tradition, it has become an increasingly social ceremony practiced in groups. Tashlikh can be performed any time until Hoshana Rabba, and some Hasidic communities perform Tashlikh on the day before Yom Kippur.

Greetings
Often Shanah Tovah Umetukah, meaning "[have a] Good and Sweet Year", is used. In Yiddish the greeting is אַ גוט יאָר "a gut yor" ("a good year") or אַ גוט געבענטשט יאָר "a gut gebentsht yor" ("a good blessed year"). The formal Sephardic greeting is Tizku Leshanim Rabbot ("may you merit many years"), to which the answer is Ne'imot VeTovot ("pleasant and good ones"); while in Ladino, they say אנייאדה בואינה, דולסי אי אליגרי "anyada buena, dulse i alegre" ("may you have a good, sweet and happy New Year").

A more formal greeting commonly used among religiously observant Jews is Ketivah VaChatimah Tovah, which translates as "A good inscription and sealing [in the Book of Life]", or L'shanah tovah tikatevu v'techatemu meaning "May you be inscribed and sealed for a good year". After Rosh Hashanah ends, the greeting is changed to G'mar chatimah tovah meaning "A good final sealing", until Yom Kippur. After Yom Kippur is over, until Hoshana Rabbah, as Sukkot ends, the greeting is Gmar Tov, "a good conclusion".

In Karaite Judaism
Unlike the denominations of Rabbinical Judaism, Karaite Judaism believes the Jewish New Year starts with the first month and celebrates this holiday only as it is mentioned in the Torah, that is as a day of rejoicing and shouting. Karaites allow no work on the day except what is needed to prepare food (Leviticus 23:23, 24).

In Samaritanism
Samaritans preserve the biblical name of the holiday, Yom Teruah, and do not consider the day to be a New Year's day.

Duration and timing

The Torah defines Rosh Hashanah as a one-day celebration, and since days in the Hebrew calendar begin at sundown, the beginning of Rosh Hashanah is at sundown at the end of 29 Elul. Since the time of the destruction of the Second Temple of Jerusalem in 70 CE and the time of Rabban Yohanan ben Zakkai, normative Jewish law appears to be that Rosh Hashanah is to be celebrated for two days, because of the difficulty of determining the date of the new moon. Nonetheless, there is some evidence that Rosh Hashanah was celebrated on a single day in Israel as late as the thirteenth century CE.

Orthodox and Conservative Judaism now generally observe Rosh Hashanah for the first two days of Tishrei, even in Israel where all other Jewish holidays dated from the new moon last only one day. The two days of Rosh Hashanah are said to constitute "Yoma Arichtah" (Aramaic: "one long day"). In Reform Judaism, while most congregations in North America observe only the first day of Rosh Hashanah, some follow the traditional two-day observance as a sign of solidarity with other Jews worldwide. Karaite Jews, who do not recognize Rabbinic Jewish oral law and rely on their own understanding of the Torah, observe only one day on the first of Tishrei, since the second day is not mentioned in the Written Torah.

Date
Originally, the date of Rosh Hashanah was determined based on observation of the new moon ("molad"), and thus could fall on any day of the week. However, around the third century CE, the Hebrew calendar was fixed, such that the first day of Rosh Hashanah never falls out on Sunday, Wednesday, or Friday.

Rosh Hashanah occurs 163 days after the first day of Passover, and thus is usually (but not always) determined by the new moon closest to the autumnal equinox.

In terms of the Gregorian calendar, the earliest date on which Rosh Hashanah can fall is 5 September, as happened in 1842, 1861, 1899, and 2013. The latest Gregorian date that Rosh Hashanah can occur is 5 October, as happened in 1815, 1929, and 1967, and will happen again in 2043. After 2089, the differences between the Hebrew calendar and the Gregorian calendar will result in Rosh Hashanah falling no earlier than 6 September. Starting in 2214, the new latest date will be 6 October.

In 2020 the Jewish President of Ukraine, Volodymyr Zelenskyy, announced that Ukraine would declare Rosh Hashanah a national holiday. This makes Ukraine the only country besides Israel where the day is a national holiday. Traditionally, mostly orthodox men travel to Uman every year to pray at the tomb of Rabbi Nachman.

Gallery of Rosh Hashanah greeting cards

See also

 Christian observances of Jewish holidays: Feast of Trumpets
 Jewish holidays
 Rosh Hashana kibbutz
 Unetanneh Tokef

Notes

References

Bibliography

External links

 Torah Content on Rosh Hashana – Text, audio & video classes, Times, and Q&A about Rosh HaShana
 Marking the New Year From the Yad Vashem's Collections – Online exhibition on the celebration of Rosh Hashanah and Yom Kippur before, during, and after the Holocaust
 Rosh Hashanah Prayers by Chazzanim – an audio, video and printed guide to the Rosh Hashanah prayers

 
Adam and Eve
Autumn festivals
Hebrew names of Jewish holy days
Hebrew words and phrases in Jewish law
Tishrei observances
New Year celebrations